The Ben Laney Bridge is a historic bridge carrying U.S. Route 79 Business (US 79 Bus.) over the Ouachita River in Camden, Arkansas. The steel Pratt truss bridge was built in 1945–47, and dedicated to Acting Governor (and former Camden mayor) Benjamin Travis Laney. Its construction was delayed due to a shortage of steel. The bridge also includes a  approach of I-beam decking, which was built in 1934.

The bridge was listed on the National Register of Historic Places in 2000.

See also
 
 
 
 
 National Register of Historic Places listings in Ouachita County, Arkansas
 List of bridges on the National Register of Historic Places in Arkansas

References

Road bridges on the National Register of Historic Places in Arkansas
Bridges completed in 1947
Transportation in Ouachita County, Arkansas
Buildings and structures in Camden, Arkansas
Bridges of the United States Numbered Highway System
U.S. Route 79
National Register of Historic Places in Ouachita County, Arkansas
Steel bridges in the United States
Pratt truss bridges in the United States
1947 establishments in Arkansas
Ouachita River